Carlos Castillo-Chavez (born 1952) is a Mexican-American mathematician who was Regents Professor and Joaquín Bustoz Jr. Professor of Mathematical Biology at Arizona State University. Castillo-Chavez was founder and the Executive Director of the Mathematical and Theoretical Biology Institute (MTBI) and the Institute for Strengthening the Understanding of Mathematics and Science. For 2019, Castillo-Chavez was Provost Visiting Professor in the Applied Mathematics Division and Data Science Initiative at Brown University. Castillo-Chavez retired from Arizona State University at the end of spring 2020.

Biography
Castillo-Chavez moved to the United States from Mexico in 1974, at the age of 22. He began working at a cheese factory in Wisconsin to support himself. He then returned to his mathematics studies by applying to the University of Wisconsin–Stevens Point, where he graduated in 1976 with dual degrees in mathematics and Spanish literature. He continued his MS in Mathematics at University of Wisconsin–Milwaukee. He holds a Ph.D. in mathematics from the University of Wisconsin–Madison (1984). Prior to moving to Arizona State University in 2004, he spent 18 years as a professor at Cornell University. He has published scientific articles and books, and served on panels and committees for organizations such as the National Science Foundation, the Alfred P. Sloan Foundation, the National Institutes of Health, Society for Industrial and Applied Mathematics, and the American Mathematical Society.

His research interests, as a mathematical epidemiologist, relate to the mechanisms underlying the spread of diseases and their containment, prevention of spread and elimination. In 2006, Arizona State University described him as one of the most prominent mathematicians in the country, an expert in epidemiological modeling, and among the top research contributors to literature on the progression of diseases. He also worked as rector of Yachay Tech University in Ecuador from 2016 to 2018.

His 52 PhD students include 21 women, 29 from US underrepresented groups and 7 from Latin America. He has been a research co-mentor to over 500 undergraduates-most though the Mathematical and Theoretical Biology Institute or MTBI[9] that he founded in 1996. Recognized by his mentoring and motivational skills, Castillo-Chavez has inspired hundred of students to become mentors and dedicate service to others.  He has received recognition for his work on enhancing prospects for academic success and providing research opportunities for underrepresented groups in mathematics and biology.

Castillo-Chavez is the only Latino-heritage mathematician listed among the top 250 doctoral advisors, according to the Mathematics Genealogy Project.

Research 
Carlos Castillo-Chavez' research program lives at the interface of the mathematical and natural and social sciences, with emphasis on:

 the role of dynamic social landscapes on disease dispersal, evolution and control;
 the study of environmental risk, social structures and human behavior on disease dynamics including addiction.

Models for the spread of scientific concepts, ideas, or media driven information have been introduced. Research on gun dynamics and their relationship with recurrent mass shootings is being conducted primarily under the leadership of Sherry Towers.

Castillo-Chavez has co-authored over 250 publications and a dozen books, textbooks, research monographs and edited volumes. [26] Castillo-Chavez and collaborators carry out research on the role of behavior and mobility on the dynamics of emergent and re-emergent diseases including Ebola, influenza, tuberculosis, and Zika. Finally, the dynamics of collaborative and active learning inspired and supported by the deep mentoring efforts carried out via the Mathematical Biology Institute or MTBI, founded in 1996, have resulted in publications that highlight models and frameworks for collaborative learning through user-inspired research.

Mathematical and Theoretical Biology Institute 
The Mathematical and Theoretical Biology Institute (MTBI) was originally established in 1996 at Cornell University by Castillo-Chavez, before it was moved to Arizona State University in the spring of 2004. MTBI funding was provided by Cornell University and Los Alamos National Laboratory (T-Division) from 1996 to 2004. Currently, MTBI is funded in part by the National Science Foundation (NSF), the National Security Agency (NSA), Arizona State University and the Office of the Executive Vice-President and Provost of the University. The high level of financial and administrative support provided by ASU to MTBI is a reflection of the serious commitment to recruitment and retention efforts within the fields of mathematics and science.

 

MTBI is an intensive summer research experience that prepares undergraduate students for the rigors of graduate level research at the interface of mathematics, statistics, and the natural and social sciences. Select students are invited to Arizona State University for eight weeks, where their time is split between classroom instruction on research methods and hands-on research projects.

MTBI has recruited and enrolled a total of 507 regular first-time undergraduate students and 78 advanced (returning) students. Of these regular students 420 are U.S. citizens or permanent residents; 290 (69%) are underrepresented minorities and/or members of the Sloan Pipeline Program (URMs include Hispanic, African American and Native American students). have been provided mentoring (many of these teaching and grad assistants returned to MTBI for multiple years). Through July 2017, 281 out of 420 (67%) of U.S. MTBI student participants had enrolled in graduate or professional school programs (this number includes teaching/graduate assistants who were involved with MTBI over the course of multiple years). Two hundred five (205) are underrepresented minorities (66% of all MTBI US participants who entered graduate or professional schools were URMs). To date 129 US MTBI student participants have completed their Ph.Ds, 97 of whom are URMs; 75% of US MTBI Ph.D. recipients are URMs.

He was also director of Institute for Strengthening and the Joaquin Bustoz Math-Science Honors Program (JBMSHP). JBMSHP is a summer residential mathematics program intended for mature and motivated students who are interested in academic careers requiring mathematics, science, or engineering-based coursework and who are typically underrepresented in those fields of study. Selected participants include first-generation college bound students and students representing diverse backgrounds from high schools throughout the State of Arizona, including rural communities and the Navajo Nation.

Participants live on the Arizona State University (ASU) Tempe campus while enrolled in a university level mathematics course for college credit such as College Algebra, Pre-Calculus, Calculus I, Calculus II, or Applied Mathematics in the Life and Social Sciences. In addition to the coursework, students work in groups to conduct applied mathematics research involving real-life mathematics problems to help deepen their understanding of the class material. Students present their findings in an oral presentation to their class peers and JBMSHP staff as well as at a poster symposium for faculty, staff, and family members. Tutoring and problem-solving sessions are provided as well as a variety of academic presentations and activities. Tuition, room and board, textbooks, and classroom expenses are provided at no cost to the student.

Since 1985, 2,820 students have participated in the JBMSHP. 58% of the participants have been female. 50% are Hispanic, 16% are Native American, 13% are Asian, 13% are Caucasian, and 8% are African American. 35% of the students who attend the JBMSHP attend for multiple summers, earning as many as 11 university credits before enrolling at a university as a first-time freshman.

Simon A. Levin Mathematical, Computational and Modeling Sciences Center 
Applied Mathematics for the Life and Social Sciences (AMLSS) investigates and integrates complex areas of the physical, life and social sciences while preparing a new generation of students in mathematics. The objective of these programs is to develop critical thinking skills and purposeful competencies in mathematics, as well as an appreciation for the contributions of mathematics to the fields of science, engineering, business, government and economics. The Levin Center members have a history of stimulating synergistic cross-disciplinary activities, and initiating biological, environmental and sociological research that involves a significant use of quantitative methods—mathematics, modeling, statistics and simulations. The center's name was motivated by the work conducted by Simon A. Levin, Distinguished University Professor in the Department of Ecology and Evolution and the Director of the Center for BioComplexity at Princeton University. Research areas include Public Health, Infectious Diseases, Social Dynamics, Human-Environmental Interactions, Theoretical Biology, Applied Mathematics, Statistics and Simulations.

Castillo-Chavez was the founder of the Applied Mathematics in the Life and Social Sciences Degrees (2008) Ph.D. programs. and BS The Ph.D. program at Arizona State University aims to produce "a new generation of scientists with an understanding of global issues and vigorous training in quantitative theory and methods. [The] graduates come from a wide range of backgrounds and will be able to quickly adapt to the changing employment demands we are already seeing in areas such as homeland security, sustainability and conservation biology, urban system dynamics, public health, disease evolution and addiction, infrastructure and technological research."

Awards and recognition
 Three White House Awards (1992, 1997, and 2011). His MTBI program received the Presidential Awards for Excellence in Science, Mathematics and Engineering Mentoring (PAESMEM)
 The 12th American Mathematical Society Distinguished Public Service Award in 2010.
 The 2007 Mentor Award from the American Association for the Advancement of Science (AAAS).
 The 17th recipient of the SIAM Prize for Distinguished Service to the Profession
 He was a member of the Board of Higher Education at the National Academy of Sciences (2009-2015) and served in President Barack Obama Committee on the National Medal of Science (2010-2015).
Fellow of the American Association for the Advancement of Science; Society for Industrial and Applied Mathematics; Founding Fellow of the American Mathematical Society; and American College of Epidemiology
He has held honorary Professorships at Xi’an Jiatong University in China, the Universidad de Belgrano in Argentina and East Tennessee State University. Past appointments include a Stanislaw M. Ulam Distinguished Scholar at Los Alamos National Laboratory, a Cátedra Patrimonial at UNAM in México, and a Martin Luther King Jr. Professorship at MIT.
 On February 24, 2016, the University Francisco Gavidia inaugurated the Centro de Modelaje Matemático Carlos Castillo-Chavez, in the City of San Salvador, in El Salvador.
 Castillo-Chavez serves in NSF’s Advisory Committee for Education and Human Resources (2016-2019) and in NSF’s Cyber Infrastructure Advisory Boards (2016-2019).
He is the inaugural recipient of the William Yslas Velez Outstanding STEM Award, co-sponsored by the Victoria Foundation and the Pasqua Yaqui Tribe of Arizona (2015).
Elected as a Member-at-Large of the Section on Mathematics of the AAAS (2-16, 2016 through 2-17 2020).
 April 2017, Castillo-Chavez was invited by Brown University to offer a lecture in the Series "Thinking Out Loud", named The Role of Contagion in the Building and Sustainability of Communities. 
 The Pete C. Garcia, Victoria Foundation - Higher Education Award. Outstanding Latina/o Faculty: Research in Higher Education Award. Sep 4, 2019.

Appointments
Primary

 School of Human Evolution and Social Change
 Global Institute of Sustainability, Distinguished Sustainability Scientist
 Founding Director Simon A. Levin Mathematical, Computational & Modeling Sciences Center
 ASU-SFI Center for Biosocial Complex Systems
Center for Gender Equity in Science and Technology

External

Santa Fe Institute, External Faculty Member
 Biological Statistics and Computational Biology, Cornell University - Adjunct Faculty

Selected publications
Books (selected)

 Carlos Castillo-Chavez, Fred Brauer, Zhilan Feng (2019). Mathematical Models in Epidemiology. New York: Springer. 
 Carlos Castillo-Chavez, Fred Brauer (2013). Mathematical Models for Communicable Diseases. SIAM. 
 Clemence, Dominic; Gumel, Abba; Castillo-Chávez, Carlos; Mickens, Ronald E. (2006). Mathematical studies on human disease dynamics: emerging paradigms and challenges: AMS-IMS-SIAM Joint Summer Research Conference, competitive mathematical models of disease dynamics: emerging paradigms and challenges, July 17–21, 2005, Snowbird, Utah. Providence, Rhode Island: American Mathematical Society. .
 Castillo-Chávez, Carlos (2003). Bioterrorism: mathematical modeling applications in homeland security. Philadelphia: Society for Industrial and Applied Mathematics. .
 Blower, Sally; Castillo-Chávez, Carlos (Ed) (2002). Mathematical approaches for emerging and reemerging infectious diseases: an introduction. Berlin: Springer. .
 Castillo-Chávez, Carlos; Brauer, Fred (2001). Mathematical models in population biology and epidemiology. Berlin: Springer. .
 Carlos Castillo-Chavez (editor) (1989). Mathematical and Statistical Approaches to AIDS Epidemiology. Springer-Verlag Berlin Heidelberg. 

Scientific articles (selected/most cited out of more than 250 publications)

 Castillo-Chavez Carlos, Derdei Bichara, and Benjamin R Morin. Perspectives on the role of mobility, behavior, and time scales in the spread of diseases. Proceedings of the National Academy of Sciences, 113(51):14582–14588, 2016.
 Chowell, D., C. Castillo-Chavez, S Krishna, X Qiu, Modelling the effect of early detection of Ebola- The Lancet Infectious Diseases, 15(2): 148--149, 2015
 Carlos Castillo-Chavez, Roy Curtiss, Peter Daszak, Simon A. Levin, Oscar Patterson-Lomba, Charles Perrings, George Poste, and Sherry Towers. Beyond Ebola: lessons to mitigate future pandemics. The Lancet Global Health 3 (7), e354-e355. 2015
Eli P. Fenichel, Carlos Castillo-Chavez, M. G. Ceddia, Gerardo Chowell, Paula A. Gonzalez Parra, Graham J. Hickling, Garth Holloway, Richard Horan, Benjamin Morin, Charles Perrings, Michael Springborn, Leticia Velazquez, and Cristina Villalobos, “Adaptive human behavior in epidemiological models,” Proceedings of the National Academy of Sciences PNAS, USA 2011; 108:6306-11
 Castillo-Chavez, C. and B. Song: “Dynamical Models of Tuberculosis and applications,” Journal of Mathematical Biosciences and Engineering, 1(2): 361-404, 2004.
 Castillo-Chavez C., Z. Feng and W. Huang. “On the computation Ro and its role on global stability,” In: Mathematical Approaches for Emerging and Reemerging Infectious Diseases: An Introduction, IMA Volume 125, 229-250, Springer-Verlag, Berlin-Heidelberg-New York. Edited by Carlos Castillo-Chavez with Pauline van den Driessche, Denise Kirschner and Abdul-Aziz Yakubu, 2002.
 Chowell, G., Hengartner, N.W., Castillo-Chavez, C., Fenimore, P.W., Hyman, J.M. “The Basic Reproductive Number of Ebola and the Effects of Public Health Measures:  The Cases of Congo and Uganda.”  Journal of Theoretical Biology, 229(1): 119-126 (July 2004)

References

External links
Mathematical and Theoretical Biology Institute and Institute for Strengthening the Understanding of Mathematics and Science
Carlos Castillo-Chavez at the SACNAS Biography Project
Interview with Carlos Castillo-Chavez at AAAS

Arizona State University faculty
American mathematicians
Mexican scientists
Mexican mathematicians
Cornell University faculty
1952 births
University of Wisconsin–Madison College of Letters and Science alumni
University of Wisconsin–Milwaukee alumni
University of Wisconsin–Stevens Point alumni
Fellows of the American Mathematical Society
Living people
Fellows of the Society for Industrial and Applied Mathematics
Santa Fe Institute people
Brown University faculty